The following is a list of massacres that have occurred in Bangladesh (numbers may be approximate):

References 

Bangladesh
Massacres

Massacres